Asya (born 24 February 1965) is a Turkish pop singer and songwriter who appeared as backing vocalist for Nilüfer between 1990 and 1994. Her first album, Asya was released in 1994. She worked with Onno Tunç, Garo Mafyan, Mustafa Sandal, Gökhan Kırdar, Deneb Pinjo, İskender Paydaş and Özgür Buldum.

Discography 
 Asya (1994), (Yaşar Plak/1994)
 Asya (1996), (Yaşar Plak/1996)
 Masum (Innocent), (Yaşar Plak/1999)
 Dönmem Yolumdan (I don't Retract from My Way), (Sony Müzik Türkiye/2002)
 Aşktır Beni Güzel Yapan (This is Love That Makes Me Beautiful), (Seyhan Müzik/2007)
 Aşk İz Bırakır, (2014)
 Asya (Remixes), (2021)

Music videos 
 Vurulmuşum Sana (I have Fallen in Love with You)
 Romantik Aşk (Romantic Love)
 Uçtum Seninle (I Flied With You)
 Yoksun Sen (You have Perished)
 Beni Aldattın (You Betrayed Me)
 İsyankar (Mutinous)
 Ayrılmak Zor (Parting with You is Hard)
 Masum (Innocent)
 Pişmanım (I've Repented)
 Olmadı Yar (No My Love)
 Nazara Geldik (Struck by The Evil Eye)
 Gittin Gideli (Since You have Gone)
 [https://www.youtube.com/watch?v=fkSvJzbuSqQ Git Güle Güle] (Go, Bye Bye)''

References 
 Asya biyografi, diskografi ve şarkı sözleri
 Sabah Gazetesi (1999)
 Michael Show (2002)
 Sabah Gazetesi Ropörtaj (2007)
 Hürriyet Gazetesi (2007)
 Zaman Gazetesi Cumaertesi ekinde yer alan ropörtaj (2007)

1965 births
Living people
Turkish women singers
Turkish pop singers
People from Eskişehir